The Hamburg Stock Exchange is the oldest stock exchange in Germany. It was founded in 1558 in the Free and Hanseatic city of Hamburg. Four different individual exchanges now exist under its umbrella: the Insurance Exchange, Grain Exchange, Coffee Exchange, along with the General Exchange.

References

External links

 

Financial services companies established in the 16th century
Stock exchanges in Germany
Economy of Hamburg
Buildings and structures in Hamburg-Mitte
1558 establishments in Europe